Below is a list of governors of California by education.  Most California governors received a college education, especially since 1895. Of the nineteenth century governors, half attended college. College degrees have set governors apart from the general population, and governors of California have often held such a degree even when this was extremely rare and, indeed, unnecessary for practicing most occupations, including law. Every California governor since 1923 has had a degree, with the most degrees being attained from UC Berkeley.

List of governors of California by education

List by institutions

External links
Governors of California - State of California
National Governors Association - Governors of California

 Education
Lists of California politicians
California 
California education
Governors